The Minister of Supply was the minister in the British Government responsible for the Ministry of Supply, which existed to co-ordinate the supply of equipment to the national armed forces. The position was campaigned for by many sceptics of the foreign policy of the National Government in the 1930s before finally being created in 1939.

In World War II there was a separate Ministry of Aircraft Production; the first minister Beaverbrook later became Minister of Supply. When W. A. Robotham was Chief Engineer of Tank Design in the Ministry of Supply, he demanded sound manganese steel castings for tank tracks, as a broken track could be a death warrant for the crew. The Beaver "rightly" accused him of holding up production, and took a poor view of Robotham's observation "that they had enough unreliable tanks to last us the rest of the war!". In July 1941, 25% of British tanks were immobilised from mechanical failure, although there was no enemy action in the theatres of war! 

The Ministry of Aircraft Production was amalgamated into the Ministry of Supply in July 1945.

In the post-war governments, the Ministry became increasingly unpopular with economy-minded Conservatives, who objected to it as a redundant middle-man. This point of view was shared by Reginald Maudling, who served as the Minister under Anthony Eden and refused to continue in office under Harold Macmillan, who had served in a junior role in the Ministry and believed in it. Nevertheless, he agreed to wind it up in 1959.

Minister of Supply 1939–1959

Further reading

References

Supply
Defunct ministerial offices in the United Kingdom
Ministries disestablished in 1959
Ministries established in 1939